This is a list of airports in French Guiana, sorted by location.

French Guiana (officially Guyane) is an overseas department (département d'outre-mer, DOM) of France, located on the northern Atlantic coast of South America. It has borders with two nations, Brazil to the east and south, and Suriname to the west. The capital city is Cayenne.



Airports 

ICAO location identifiers are linked to each airport's Aeronautical Information Publication (AIP), which are available online in Portable Document Format (PDF) from the French Service d'information aéronautique (SIA). Locations shown in bold are as per the airport's AIP page. Airport names shown in bold have scheduled commercial airline service.

Statistics

See also 
 Transport in French Guiana
 List of airports in France
 List of airports by ICAO code: S#SO - French Guiana''
 Wikipedia: WikiProject Aviation/Airline destination lists: South America#French Guiana (France)

References 

 Aeronautical Information Service / Service d'information aéronautique (SIA)
 Aeronautical Information Publications (AIP)
  Union des Aéroports Français
 Great Circle Mapper: Airports in French Guiana
 
  - includes IATA codes

 
Airports
Guiana
French Guiana